Bothell High School is located in Bothell, Washington, United States, and is one of four high schools in the Northshore School District. Approximately 1,500 students in grades 9 through 12 attend the school, which is a member of the KingCo 4A athletic conference.

The high school has alternated between in-person and online classes and has also had to close temporarily due to the COVID-19 pandemic.

Football team controversy
In the spring of 2019, a student reported to Bothell Police that he had overheard football players in the locker room discussing "Rape Squad", which is a practice where, upon one yelling the words, multiple athletes would restrain a teammate, remove their pants, and poke at their genitals. The police investigation into the incident was closed days later.

In August 2019 after the on-campus "Camp Bothellhood", three players aged 14 and 15 reported being victims of similar behavior. Bothell Police Officer Garret Ware closed the case on September 20, dismissing it as "horseplay" and lacking "criminal intent or sexual motivation."

Shop teacher attack hoax 
On May 19, 2016, a shop teacher at Bothell High School was found with a zip tie around his neck and non-fatal injuries to his head. At first, he claimed to have been attacked by an assailant, but later claimed it was a suicide attempt. He pleaded guilty to misdemeanor charges of making a false statement and obstruction, and resigned.

Reactions to the event were mixed. Many students were afraid to come back to campus initially, and classes were cancelled the day after the incident. However, some students made comments showing skepticism of the official narrative. Bothell's first ever lip dub video was dedicated to the teacher, before it came out that he had been lying.

Science Olympiad
The Bothell High School Science Olympiad team placed first in the state competition in 2007, 2008, 2009, 2016 and 2019, thus qualifying to attend the national competition. In 2007, Bothell High placed 28th at Nationals, in 2008 17th, in 2009 15th, in 2016 29th, and in 2019 27th.  The Science Olympiad team earned second place at the state tournament in 2010, 2011, 2013, 2014, 2015, 2017, 2018, and 2021.

Notable alumni

Del Bates '58 - major league baseball player for the Philadelphia Phillies
Gary A. Wegner '63 - astronomer, Professor of Physics and Astronomy at Dartmouth
Patty Murray '68 - current U.S. Senator, assistant Democratic leader of Senate
Rep Porter '89 - professional poker player and 3-time World Series of Poker bracelet winner
Sean O'Donnell (EPA) '91 - current Inspector General of the U.S. Environmental Protection Agency and previous acting Inspector General of the U.S. Department of Defense
Bryan Alvarez '93 - professional wrestler, author, and radio show host
Layla Angulo '93 - saxophonist, composer, and recording artist specializing in Latin music
Mark Dugdale '93 - IFBB professional bodybuilder
John Leonard '93 - plaintiff in Leonard v. Pepsico, commonly known as the Pepsi Points Case
Chris Walla '93 - singer-songwriter, guitarist, producer, and former member of Death Cab for Cutie
Kyle Cease '96 - actor, comedian, and motivational speaker
Daniel Sandrin '98 - Korean Basketball League player
Robert Delong '04 - drummer, singer/songwriter; primary genres include electronica, EDM, and moombahton
Johnny Hekker '08 - NFL punter for the Carolina Panthers
Zach LaVine '13 - NBA player and two-time Slam Dunk Contest champion ('15, '16)
 Ross Bowers '15 - quarterback for the California Golden Bears

References

External links 
 Bothell High School homepage
 Construction (2007-2008) Phase III, Dykeman Design
 State OSPI report card 2012-13
 State OSPI report card 2017-18

High schools in Snohomish County, Washington
High schools in King County, Washington
Public high schools in Washington (state)
Schools in Bothell, Washington